Wanderléa Charlup Boere Salim (born June 5, 1946 in Governador Valadares, Minas Gerais) is a Brazilian singer and former co-host of the historic television show Jovem Guarda alongside Roberto Carlos and Erasmo Carlos. The show aired on TV Record between 1965 and 1968. Wanderléa was nicknamed Ternurinha (roughly "little darling") after her first hit "Ternura" ("Somehow it got to be tomorrow").

Biography 
Wanderléa was born on June 5, 1946, in Governador Valadares, Minas Gerais, Brazil.  After her birth, the family moved to the city of Lavras, also in Minas Gerais. In 1955, they moved to the Ilha do Governador neighborhood in Rio de Janeiro.

She became known in the late 1950s singing on radio.  In the early 1960s she made her first phonographic recordings of rock and roll, and impressed by the way she sang.

In 1965, she was invited to present a television show together with singers Roberto Carlos and Erasmo Carlos, the famous Jovem Guarda show, which soon became the first youth movement in Brazil, influenced by the Beatles. Wanderléa was responsible for influencing fashion among girls from the 1960s in Brazil, becoming the first pop star in the country.

Personal life 
Wanderléa suffered many losses in her life. The first of these was when she was ten years old, when her older sister was killed by a stray bullet. This fact forever shook the life of Wanderléa and her entire family.

At the beginning of her career, at age sixteen, she started dating Zé Renato, the son of Chacrinha. In a few months of dating they became engaged. After seven years together, there was a tragedy; Zé had an accident and was paralyzed. Wanderléa went into serious depression and over time the relationship went into crisis because he didn't want to be a burden in her life. Despite having fought for him, she respected Zé's decision and separated from her fiancé.

After the separation, she dated some singers and songwriters at the time. She also had a short relationship with Roberto Carlos. Then she met Chilean guitarist Lalo Correia, better known as Lalo California. The two started dating and soon got married. In 1982, the couple's first child, Leonardo, was born. Leonardo drowned in 1984, at the age of two. The boy was riding a tricycle and accidentally fell into a pool. He was rescued but did not survive. They two had two more daughters, Yasmin and Jadde. The two are less than two years apart and were born in the late 1980s.

She went through other losses, such as the death of her father, which left her very shaken.  In 1996, shortly after her father’s death, her brother died of HIV/AIDS, which made her fall into depression. This shook her emotionally to the point that, according to her, it caused her uterine cancer, for which she required a hysterectomy. But she managed to regain her health and spirit, and in her own words, "if a problem arises I say: 'Let's see how we can solve it', and it doesn't change."

She is still married to Lalo, but the two live in separate houses, and the singer says she is very happy like that, as she realized that living together they didn't get along so well. Because the couple likes a freer relationship, they live together like partners.

She revealed in interviews that she was bothered by her fame, which brought her problems with time; for example, when passing in the street with their imported cars, humble people pointed her out in the streets, commenting, "Here goes Wanderléa with her big car.” This annoyed her and said that she was once very poor and understands the suffering of the humble, but no one recognized that. Since the days of the Jovem Guarda, she has had the nickname Ternurinha, which at the beginning she didn't like very much.  She even thought of launching a campaign to change it. But then she got used to it and ended up accepting it. Another nickname she also received at the time of the Jovem Guarda was Wandeca.

Discography

Studio Albums 

 1963 - Wanderléa (CBS)
 1964 - Quero Você (CBS)
 1965 - É Tempo de Amor (CBS)
 1966 - A Ternura de Wanderléa (CBS)
 1967 - Wanderléa (CBS)
 1968 - Pra Ganhar Meu Coração (CBS)
 1972 - Maravilhosa (Polydor)
 1975 - Feito Gente (Polydor)
 1977 - Vamos Que eu Já Vou (EMI)
 1978 - Mais que Paixão (EMI)
 1980 - Wanderléa (CBS)
 1981 - Ser Estranho (CBS)
 1982 - Wanderléa (CBS)
 1985 - Menino Bonito (Som Livre)
 1989 - Wanderléa (3M)
 1992 - Te Amo (Som Livre)
 1996 - O Novo de Novo - Ao Vivo (Paradoxx)
 2003 - O Amor Sobreviverá (BMG)
 2008 - Nova Estação (Lua Music)
 2016 - Vida de Artista

Compilation Albums 

 2000 - 21 Grandes Sucessos de Wanderléa (Columbia)

Filmography 

 1968 - Juventude e Ternura
 1969 - Agnaldo, Perigo a Vista
 1969 - Roberto Carlos e o Diamante Cor-de-rosa
 1971 - Roberto carlos a 300 Km Por Hora
 2008 - Nova Estação (DVD)
 2015 - Jovem aos 50 - A História de Mio Século da Jovem Guarda

See also 

 Jovem Guarda
 Roberto Carlos
 Erasmo Carlos

References

1946 births
Living people
Brazilian rock musicians
20th-century Brazilian women singers
20th-century Brazilian singers
Brazilian people of Lebanese descent
Jovem Guarda
People from Governador Valadares
21st-century Brazilian women singers
21st-century Brazilian singers